Nadendla is a village in Palnadu district of the Indian state of Andhra Pradesh. It is the headquarters of Nadendla mandal in Narasaraopet revenue division.

Demographics 
The total
population constitute,  males,  females and
 children, in the age group of 0–6 years. The average literacy rate stands at
58.00% with  literates, significantly lower than the national average of 73.00%.

Governance 

Nadendla gram panchayat is the local self-government of the village. It is divided into wards and each ward is represented by a ward member.

Education 

As per the school information report for the academic year 2018–19, the village has a total of 15 schools. These include one KGBV, 2 private and 12 Zilla Parishad/MPP schools.

See also 
List of villages in Guntur district

References 

Villages in Guntur district
Mandal headquarters in Guntur district